Vijay Madhavan is an Indian classical dancer.

Early years and education
A disciple of Chitra Visweswaran, Madhavan showed an acumen for classical dance from a young age. He received a degree in Zoology and obtained full-time work as a software product analyst prior to leaving the business world to concentrate fully on Bharatanatyam.

Bharatanatyam
In addition to owning his own dance school, he is also face of Jaya TV where he performs to the Bharathiyar song senthamizh nadenum pothinilae each morning. He is a regular performer in the Bhagavata Mela Natakams and in August 2002 he won the Vasanthalakshmi - Narasimhachari Endowment Award for Talent Promotion.

Personal life
Madhavan is married to carnatic vocalist Sumitra Vasudev, a disciple of Vidushi Vedavalli

References

External links

Year of birth missing (living people)
Living people
Indian male dancers
Bharatanatyam exponents
Indian dance teachers